LY6/PLAUR Domain Containing 6B, also known under the name Cancer/Testis Antigen 116 (CTA116) and LYPD7 is encoded by the LYPD6B gene. LYPD6B is a member of the lymphocyte antigen 6 (LY6) protein family. It is expressed in the testis, lungs, stomach, prostate and in the nervous system where it acts as a modulator of nicotinic acetylcholine receptor (nAChRs) activity.

Structure
The protein is 183 amino acids long and its molecular mass is 20.656. The gene LYPD6B encoding the protein is located on chromosome 2 in humans.

As a member of the Ly-6/uPAR family, the protein contains a disulfide β-structural core and three protruding loops.

Background
The protein was discovered for the first time in a 2009 study; its presence was detected in the cytoplasm and it was associated with activation of the AP-1 transcription factor. LYPD6B is known as a prototoxin due to its structural similarity with the 3-fingered snake venom proteins α-bungarotoxin and cobratoxin. As a prototoxin, LYPD6B also belongs to the protein family of Ly-6/urokinase plasminogen activator receptor (Ly6/uPAR). It has a 3-fingered motif secondary structure which appears due to the presence of 8–10 cysteine residues that facilitate disulfide bond formation.

Role
The protein is expressed in the nervous system where it acts as an enhancer of the activity of the neurotransmitter acetylcholine certain α7-containing nicotinic acetylcholine receptors, which have a role in learning. A duplication of the gene has been detected in a case study of two individuals with severe intellectual disability, suggesting its role in proper brain development and cognitive function. Additionally, the protein demonstrates high expression in several other normal organs including the testis, lungs, stomach, and prostate.

Hypermethylation of the gene and a subsequent decreased expression has been demonstrated as one of the contributors to the invasive capacity of cancer cells in melanoma.

The protein LYPD6 also leads to an increase in Wnt/β-catenin signaling.

References